From the 29th of May 2017 until the 14th of June 2021, Eugene Rhuggenaath (born 4 February 1970) was the Curaçaoan 7th Prime minister before Gilmar Pisas won the 2021 elections. He previously served as Minister for Economic Development in the Koeiman-Cabinet in 2016. He served as a member of the Island Council (2003–2009) and a member of parliament till 2021.

During the 2017 Curaçao general election his party received the most votes. Rhuggenaath was appointed formateur by the governor to form a coalition government.

Rhuggenaath was sworn in as prime minister on 29 May 2017.

On 29 September 2017 Rhuggenaath held a speech calling for more acceptance at the Curaçao Gay Pride, activists called the speech "historical".

Rhuggenaath led the national crisis team during the 2020 COVID-19 crisis, and requested a financial aid package by the Netherlands, while 20 per cent of the population was dependent on food aid. Dutch financial aid package was conditioned in June 2020, requiring among other things a 25% wage benefits reduction for both cabinet members and members of parliament, as well as a reduction of 12.5% for all public servants; the latter leading to quite some opposition given its impact not only on government workers, but also those in essential functions including healthcare and education. 

The Netherlands later proposed a significant reforms package to be embedded in a Kingdom law (‘Rijkswet’). The draft legislation was initially not accepted as the approval of such law must be preceded by a dialogue and consensus process. However, recognizing the benefits of longer-term collaboration with the Netherlands and the implementation of the reform package geared toward post-Covid recovery, building resilience and capacity for sustainable economic growth, Rhuggenaath persisted in engaging in dialogue with the Dutch government and eventually the reform package and a revised draft legislation was agreed and signed in November 2020.  The reform package is supported by the IMF and is still being implemented.

Standard and Poor's Sovereign ratings lowered its expectations due to challenges impacting public finances, preceding the COVID-19 crisis, including the domestic situation in Venezuela, Venezuela’s decision to close its borders with Aruba, Curacao and Bonaire and the seizing of operations of the refinery operated by the Venezuelan State-owned company, PDVSA. The Financial Supervisory Board already flagged Rhuggenaath's government several times preceding the COVID-19 crisis that it was in breach of the budgetary norms imposed as part the debt relief scheme implemented by the Netherlands in 2010, leading to interventions by the Dutch Government in 2019. The majority of the conditions forming part of this intervention, was later overturned by the Kingdom State Council ('Raad van State'). 

Prior to this Rhuggenaath’s cabinet developed a growth strategy, which included initiatives to foster economic growth, stabilizing public financing, modernizing the government apparatus to improve efficiency and public services as well as a social development agenda.  The Dutch government agreed to support Rhuggenaath’s growth agenda, and a growth accord was also signed in 2019.  The growth accord was the precedent to the accords signed in November 2020.

Rhuggenaath was elected for parliament in the 2021 Curaçao general election, but relinquished his seat.

https://www.curacaochronicle.com/post/local/curacao-government-we-have-reached-an-agreement-with-the-netherlands/==References==

1970 births
Living people
Prime Ministers of Curaçao
Economy ministers of Curaçao
Members of the Estates of Curaçao
Party for the Restructured Antilles politicians
Recipients of Pravasi Bharatiya Samman